Antonio Siddi (16 June 1923 – 21 January 1983) was an Italian athlete, who mainly competed in the 100 metres. He also competed in the long jump.

Biography
He was born in Sassari and competed for Italy at the 1948 Summer Olympics held in London, Great Britain, where he won the bronze medal with his team mates Michele Tito, Enrico Perucconi and Carlo Monti in the men's 4 x 100 metre relay event.

Achievements

See also
 Italy national relay team

References

External links
 
 

1923 births
1983 deaths
People from Sassari
Italian male sprinters
Italian male long jumpers
Olympic bronze medalists for Italy
Athletes (track and field) at the 1948 Summer Olympics
Athletes (track and field) at the 1952 Summer Olympics
Olympic athletes of Italy
European Athletics Championships medalists
Sportspeople from Sardinia
Medalists at the 1948 Summer Olympics
Olympic bronze medalists in athletics (track and field)
Mediterranean Games gold medalists for Italy
Mediterranean Games silver medalists for Italy
Athletes (track and field) at the 1951 Mediterranean Games
Mediterranean Games medalists in athletics
Italian Athletics Championships winners
20th-century Italian people